This is a list of election results for the 2020 Queensland state election.

Results summary

Results by electoral district

Algester

Aspley

Bancroft

Barron River

Bonney

Broadwater

Buderim

Bulimba

Bundaberg

Bundamba

Burdekin

Burleigh

Burnett

Cairns

Callide

Caloundra

Capalaba

Chatsworth

Clayfield

Condamine

Cook

Coomera

Cooper

Currumbin

Everton

Ferny Grove

Gaven

Gladstone

Glass House

Greenslopes

Gregory

Gympie

Hervey Bay

Hill

Hinchinbrook

Inala

Ipswich

Ipswich West

Jordan

Kawana

Keppel

Kurwongbah

Lockyer

Logan

Lytton

Macalister

McConnel

Mackay

Maiwar

Mansfield

Maroochydore

Maryborough

Mermaid Beach

Miller

Mirani

Moggill

Morayfield

Mount Ommaney

Mudgeeraba

Mulgrave

Mundingburra

Murrumba

Nanango

Nicklin

Ninderry

Noosa

Nudgee

Oodgeroo

Pine Rivers

Pumicestone

Redcliffe

Redlands

Rockhampton

Sandgate

Scenic Rim

South Brisbane

Southern Downs

Southport

Springwood

Stafford

Stretton

Surfers Paradise

Theodore

Thuringowa

Toohey

Toowoomba North

Toowoomba South

Townsville

Traeger

Warrego

Waterford

Whitsunday

Woodridge

Notes

References

Results of Queensland elections
2020 elections in Australia